Tepoto, also known as Te Poto, Toho, or Pukapoto, is a coral island. It is the northwesternmost of the Disappointment Islands, in the Tuamotu Archipelago. Despite being often referred to as "atoll", Tepoto is not a typical Tuamotu atoll, but a single separate island without a lagoon.

This island is sometimes called Tepoto Nord in French, to avoid confusion with Tepoto Atoll (Tepoto Sud)  to the southwest, in the Raeffsky Islands of central Tuamotu. An obsolete name is Otuho.

According to the 2012 census, its population was 61 inhabitants. The primary village is Tehekega.

In 2018 there were about 40 residents, 13 of which were children under the age of 12.

History
The first recorded European to arrive at Tepoto Nord was explorer John Byron in 1765. 
He named Napuka and Tepoto "Disappointment Islands" because of the lack of a safe anchorage and the hostility of the natives.

Administration
Tepoto Nord belongs to the commune of Napuka. The commune of Napuka consists of the atolls of Napuka and Tepoto Nord.

References

 Tepoto Nord
 Tepoto
Atoll names
Origin of the name (in German)

Related article 
French Polynesia

Islands of the Tuamotus